Felix Trombe (1906–1985) was a French engineer.

He was born in Nogent and died in Ganties. He is best known for his pioneering work in passive solar building design with the Trombe wall, which bears his name. He is also credited with hypothesizing passive daytime radiative cooling in 1967.

Mont-Louis Solar Furnace 

In 1949 Trombe directed the construction of the experimental 50 kW Mont-Louis Solar Furnace in the Pyrénées-Orientales for high temperature experiments in physics and chemistry. In 1962, a 1000 kW solar furnace was built in Odeillo.

References

20th-century French engineers
Solar building designers
1906 births
1985 deaths